Agriculture in the Empire of Japan was an important component of the pre-war Japanese economy. Although Japan had only 16% of its land area under cultivation before the Pacific War, over 45% of households made a living from farming. Japanese cultivated land was mostly dedicated to rice, which accounted for 15% of world rice production in 1937.

Historical development

Meiji period
After the end of the Tokugawa shogunate with the Meiji Restoration of 1868, Japanese agriculture was dominated by a tenant farming system. The Meiji government based its industrialization program on tax revenues from private land ownership, and the Land Tax Reform of 1873 increased the process of landlordism, with many farmers having their land confiscated due to inability to pay the new taxes.

This situation was worsened by the deflationary Matsukata Fiscal Policy of 1881–1885, which severely depressed rice prices, leading to further bankruptcies, and even to large scale rural uprisings against the government. By the end of the Meiji period, over 67% of all peasant families were driven into tenancy, and farm productivity stagnated. As tenants were forced to pay over half their crop as rent, they were often forced to send wives and daughters to textile mills or to sell daughters into prostitution to pay for taxes.

In the early Meiji period, landowners collected a high rate of rent in kind, rather than cash and consequently played a major role in the development of agriculture, since the tenant farmers found it difficult to obtain capital. Gradually, with the development of cash crops to supplement the mainstay of rice, and the growth of capitalism in general from the turn of the twentieth century onwards, agricultural cooperatives and the government took over the role by providing farm subsidies, loans, and education in new agricultural techniques.

The first agricultural cooperatives were established in 1900, after their creation was debated in the Diet of Japan by Shinagawa Yajirō and Hirata Tosuke as a means of modernizing Japanese agriculture and adapting it to a cash economy. These cooperatives served in rural areas as credit unions, purchasing cooperatives and assisted in the marketing and sales of farm products.

Taishō period
The  was a central organization for agricultural cooperatives in the Empire of Japan. It was established in 1910, and provided assistance to individual cooperatives through transmission of agricultural research and facilitating the sales of farm products. The Imperial Agricultural Association was at the peak of a three tier structure of national-prefectural-local system of agricultural.

 This organization was of vital importance after nationwide markets were consolidated under government control in the aftermath of the Rice Riots of 1918 and increasing economic crisis from the late 1920s. Increasing tenant farmer disputes and issues with landlordism also led to increasing government regulation.

After the Rice Riots of 1918, many peasants came under the influence of the urban labor movement with socialist, communist and/or agrarian ideas, which created serious political issues. Not only were the Imperial Family of Japan and the zaibatsu major landowners, but until 1928, an income tax requirement severely limited the right to vote, limiting seats in the Diet of Japan only to people of wealth. In 1922, the Nihon Nomin Kumiai (Japan Farmer's Union) was formed for collective bargaining for cultivator rights and reduced rents.

Shōwa period
By the 1930s, the growth of the urban economy and flight of farmers to the cities gradually weakened the hold of the landlords. The interwar years also saw the rapid introduction of mechanized agriculture, and the supplementation of natural animal fertilizers with chemical fertilizers and imported phosphates.

Another duty of the organization was to secure food supply to local markets and the military. It was dissolved after World War II.

Farming
Farmed land in 1937 was 14,940,000 acres (60,460 km2), which represented 15.8% of the total Japanese surface area, compared with 10,615,000 acres (42,957 km2) or 40% in Ohio (USA), or 12,881,000 acres (52,128 km2) or 21% in England. The proportion of farmed land rose from 11.8% in 1887 to 13.7% in 1902, and 14.4% in 1912 to 15.7% in 1919. This fell to 15.4% in 1929. There were 5,374,897 farmers at an average 2.67 acres (11,000 m2) per family, in comparison with any American farmer family with 155 acres (627,000 m2). These were larger in Hokkaidō and Karafuto and reduced by 2 acres (8,000 m2) in southwest area. The intense culture, fertilizers and scientific development, raised the yield to 43 bushels per acre (2.89 t/ha) in 1936.

In Japan there now is only 6,9% of farmed land.

Status per geographic region

Northern territories
The sparsely populated Chishima Islands had an inclement climate for anything other than small-scale agriculture; the economy was based the fishing, whaling, and harvest of furs and reindeer meat.

Karafuto likewise had a severe climate made cultivation difficult, along with unsuitable podzolic soils. Small scale farming was developed in the south, were land was suitable for potatoes, oats, rye, forage, and vegetables. Only 7% of Karafuto was arable. The livestock raising was quite important. Farming experiments with rice were partially successful. By 1937, 10,811 families were cultivating 86,175 acres (348.74 km2), as opposed to 8,755 families cultivating 179.9 km2  in 1926.

Hokkaidō
Hokkaidō was a target area for agricultural development since the start of the Meiji period, with the establishment of the Hokkaidō colonization Office, and with the assistance of numerous foreign advisors who introduced new crops and new agricultural techniques. Hokkaidō farms averaged 11 acres (48,000 m2), more than four times others in Japan. Despite efforts to cultivate rice on about 60% of the arable land in the territory, climate and soils were not favorable and yields were low. Other crops included oats, potatoes, vegetables, rye and wheat as well as extensive horticulture. The dairy industry was important, as was the raising of horses for use by the Imperial Japanese Army cavalry.

Farmer households numbered 2,000,000 and the government mentioned the possibility to establish another 1,000,000.

Honshū
The farms were 3.5 to 4 acres (14,000 to 16,000 m2), for rice, potatoes, rice, and rye. Northern Honshū produced 75% of apples of Japan; other products included cherries and horses. Central Honshū cultivated rice and special products including white mulberry (for silkworms) in Suwa, tea, (in Shizuoka), daikon in Aichi, and also rye, rice, grapes for wine, etc.

Shikoku & Kyūshū
Due to subtropical conditions, Shikoku and Kyūshū islands were dominated by traditional rice and sweet potato crops. Other important crops included sugar cane, bananas, Japanese citrus, tobacco, taro, and beans. Other products obtained in the highlands included rye, wheat, morel, silk and livestock raising (horses and cows).

Ryūkyūs
The tropical Ryūkyū Islands with their limited cultivatable area had a largely subsistence agriculture based on rice, sweet potatoes, sugar cane and fruits.

Taiwan
With a large ethnic Chinese population, agricultural methods and products in Taiwan were in the Chinese-style, with rice cultivation and sweet potatoes dominating. Cash crops included fruits and tea and jute & ramie. (The cultivated land was 2,116,174 acres (8,563.85 km2) at a density of 1,576 inhabitants per square mile in 1937.

The central government gave strong emphasis on development of the sugar cane industry, and Taiwan satisfied 42% of the crude sugar demand of Japan. The consumption of sugar in Japan grew from 15 lb (7 kg) in 1918 to 30 lb (14 kg) in 1928.

The central government also placed strong emphasis on the development of forestry products. Camphor wood was collected from forests or plantations under a government-monopoly (the "Formosa Manufacturing Company" from 1899).

South Seas Mandate
The equatorial tropical conditions of the South Seas Mandate islands supported farming of coconuts, taro, sweet potatoes, tapioca, bananas, pineapples and rice, for local use and export. The sugar cane industry was given strong emphasis by the central government, with principal sugar in Saipan and Palau. However, the very limited cultivable land area of the South Seas Mandate meant that fishing and whaling remained more economically important.

Philippines
Prior to the Pacific War there was a small Japanese settlement in Davao at the south of Mindanao Island which worked with Japanese private companies to cultivate abacá for Manila hemp. This was the main center of cultivation in the region, with farming of sugar cane, pineapple, bananas, sweet potato and other tropical crops. Abaca farming exceeded sugar cane cultivation in area but not in value. 25% was sent to the USA. Sisal was also exported to the US and Japan.

See also 
 Empire of Japan (foreign commerce and shipping)

References

Citations

Sources 
 Primary sources

 
 
 

 Secondary sources

 Semple, Hellen C. "Influence of Geographical Conditions upon Japanese Agriculture", Geographical Journal XL, (1912), p. 589–607.
 Penrose, E. F. "Food Supply and Raw Materials in Japan", Chicago, Chicago University Press, (1929).
 King, F. H. "Farmers of Forty Centuries", New York, Ed Harcourt (1926)
 Orchard, Dorothy E. "Agrarian Problems of Modern Japan", Journal of Political Economy XXXVII, (1929), p. 129–149, 285–311.
 Hall,　Robert Burnett." Agricultural Regions of Asia, Part VII, The Japanese Empire", Economic Geography, X,(1934), p. 323–347;X, (1935), p. 33–52, 130–147.
 Ladejinski, W. "Agrarian Unrest in Japan" Foreign Affairs XVI (1939), p. 426–433.
 Ladejinski, W. "Japan's Food Self-sufficiency", Foreign Agriculture, IV,(1940), p. 355–376.
 Dawson, O. L. & Ladejinski, W. "Recent Japanese Agricultural Policies", Foreign Agriculture　III, (1939),　p. 263–274.

External links 
 QUT Digital Collections

Empire of Japan
Agriculture in Japan
Economic history of World War II
Economic history of Japan